Fartown  may refer to:

Fartown Ground, Huddersfield 
Fartown, Huddersfield
Fartown, Pudsey

Fartown was the nickname of Huddersfield Giants rugby league team.